Vértex Vinter was a Swedish ski mountaineering competition, now discontinued, that took place in 2005–2011 in different winter sport locations.

Venues and events 

In 2004–2006 the venue was Storulvån in the Åre Ski Area, in 2007–2009 in Åre proper and in 2010–2011 in Sylarna. There were two separate events; in 2004–2009 and in 2011 there was a solo event for single competitors and in 2004–2010 a duo event for teams of two. In addition to the elite level events various additional events have been held from time to time, such as snowshoe races and shorter beginners' races.

Competition results 

The Norwegian ski mountaineer Ola Berger won the solo event six times and the men's duo event twice. The Swedish adventure racer and ski mountaineer Josefina Wikberg won the solo event twice and the women's duo event three times.

References

Ski mountaineering competitions
Skiing in Sweden